Cathedral of the Immaculate Virgin Mary or the Cathedral of Our Lady is the cathedral church of the Diocese of Jelgava, is located in Jelgava, Latvia.

History
The previous church, demolished in 1904 due to risk of collapse, dates from 1630. The new church was built in 1906 and designed by Carl Strandmann and consecrated in honor of St. George. In 1925, Bishop Jāzeps Rancāns re-consecrated the church to the Immaculate Virgin. During World War II, in July 1944, the church burned. After the war the restoration of the church began using as building materials the building blocks of previous walls. The works lasted until 1958. Further restoration work and interior finishing were completed in 1969. With the creation of the Diocese of Jelgava on December 2, 1995, in the Apostolicum ministerium Bula of Pope John Paul II, the church was elevated to cathedral status.

See also
 Roman Catholicism in Latvia
 St. Mary's Cathedral (disambiguation)

References

External links

Roman Catholic cathedrals in Latvia
Buildings and structures in Jelgava
Roman Catholic churches completed in 1906
1630 establishments in Europe
20th-century Roman Catholic church buildings in Latvia